Gary Melvin Kroll (born July 8, 1941) is an American former professional baseball right-handed pitcher, who played in Major League Baseball (MLB), appearing in 71 games over all or parts of four seasons for the Philadelphia Phillies, New York Mets (–) Houston Astros, and Cleveland Indians. The native of Culver City, California, graduated from Reseda High School and attended Brigham Young University and Los Angeles Pierce College.

Kroll signed with the Phillies in 1959 and spent 5 seasons in their farm system, before his MLB debut, on July 26, 1964. After only two appearances, he was traded to the Mets for veteran first baseman Frank Thomas on August 7.

In his only full year in the majors, Kroll worked in 32 games for the Mets, including 11 starting assignments. He won six games and lost six, recorded his only MLB complete game (a four-hit, 7–1 victory over the San Francisco Giants on April 18), and his only save (on July 25 against the Phillies).

Kroll finished his big league career with six wins, seven defeats, and an earned run average (ERA) of 4.24. In 159 innings pitched, he surrendered 147 hits, yielded 91 walks, and recorded 138 strikeouts.

After his retirement from pitching professionally in 1971, Kroll settled in Tulsa, Oklahoma, with his wife, Barbara, and five children. The Krolls have five grandchildren.

References

External links

Gary Kroll at SABR (Baseball BioProject)
Gary Kroll at Baseball Almanac
Gary Kroll at Astros Daily
Gary Kroll at Pura Pelota (Venezuelan Professional Baseball League)

1941 births
Living people
Amarillo Sonics players
Arkansas Travelers players
Bakersfield Bears players
Baseball players from California
Brigham Young University alumni
Buffalo Bisons (minor league) players
BYU Cougars baseball players
Chattanooga Lookouts players
Cleveland Indians players
Dallas Rangers players
Des Moines Demons players
Hawaii Islanders players
Houston Astros players
Johnson City Phillies players
Major League Baseball pitchers
New York Mets players
Oklahoma City 89ers players
People from Culver City, California
Philadelphia Phillies players
Portland Beavers players
Tiburones de La Guaira players
American expatriate baseball players in Venezuela
Tigres de Aragua players
Williamsport Grays players